STPP may refer to:

 Sodium tripolyphosphate, a sodium salt of triphosphoric acid
 Singareni Thermal Power Project, located at Jaipur, Mancherial District, in Telangana, India
Short-term psychodynamic psychotherapy, an intensive form of psychotherapy 
Subject to planning permission
Saint Paul and Pacific Northwest Railroad